Abbeyfeale Aerodrome  is a recreational airfield serving Abbeyfeale, a town in County Limerick in Ireland.

The runway has a  displaced threshold on each end.

Abbeyfeale is not a licensed airfield.

See also

Transport in the Republic of Ireland
List of airports in the Republic of Ireland

References

External links
OpenStreetMap - Abbeyfeale

Airports in the Republic of Ireland
Geography of County Limerick